René Emile Henri Boudreaux (27 November 1880 – 8 September 1915) was a French rugby union player.

He made his first appearance at Swansea against Wales on New Year's Day and his second and last against Scotland at Inverleith on 22 January.

During the First World War Boudreaux was recalled to serve in the French Army. He was killed in action near Aubérive while serving as a lieutenant with the 103rd Infantry Regiment of the 7th Infantry Division.

Rugby career
Boudreaux was a fencer as well as playing rugby.

Boudreaux played for the SCUF as a forward until 1910.

He was on the bench for the trials match of 20 December 1908 between the Probables and the Possibles.

The Five Nations Championship first came into being in 1910 when France joined the annual Home Nations tournament. Boudreaux played in two of the four games, against Wales and Scotland, in both of which the French were heavily defeated.

He trialled for the national team in the following season, playing on the side of the Possibles against the Probables on 18 December 1910.

For the season 1910–11, Boudreaux moved to RCF. He was selected to represent Paris in the match against London on 12 March, replacing Cadenat, who was unavailable to play.

He continued to fence after ceasing to play rugby.

International appearances

See also
 List of international rugby union players killed in action during the First World War

References

Bibliography
 Godwin, Terry Complete Who's Who of International Rugby (Cassell, 1987)

1880 births
1915 deaths
French rugby union players
France international rugby union players
French military personnel killed in World War I
French Army officers
Rugby union props